is a Japanese manga series written by Rintaro Koike and illustrated by Masayuki Taguchi. It is based in a fictional world where Japan is the 51st state of the United States, and a man-made island known as Neon is the only place in American territory where gambling and prostitution are legal. The island of Neon is home to many members of numerous mafia organizations. The story centers on Kira Kiyoshi, an ex-Marine and manager of the Onsen Hotel on the island of Neon, as well as a member of the only Japanese mafia on the island.

Further reading 
 
 
 
 

Akita Shoten manga
Seinen manga